Nathaniel Curry (March 26, 1851 – October 23, 1931) was a building contractor, manufacturer and political figure in Nova Scotia, Canada. He represented Amherst division in the Senate of Canada from 1912 to 1931.

Biography 
He was born in Port Williams, Nova Scotia, the son of Charles Curry and Eunice Davidson. Curry worked in the United States as a miner and railroad employee before returning to Nova Scotia in 1877. He established the Rhodes Curry Company (later part of Canadian Car and Foundry) in Amherst with his brother-in-law Nelson Rhodes. In 1881, he married Mary Hall. Curry was mayor of Amherst in 1894. He was chosen as president of the Canadian Manufacturers Association in 1911. That same year, Curry established the Chair of Engineering at Acadia University. He died in office at Tidnish in Cumberland County at the age of 80.

References 

 
 Marble, Allan Everett Nova Scotians at home and abroad: biographical sketches of over six hundred native born Nova Scotians (1977) p. 125 

1851 births
1931 deaths
Canadian senators from Nova Scotia
Conservative Party of Canada (1867–1942) senators
Mayors of places in Nova Scotia
People from Kings County, Nova Scotia